Murray S. Monroe Sr. (September 25, 1925 - September 2, 2003) was a Cincinnati-based lawyer for Taft, Stettinius & Hollister and founded the firm's Antitrust practice.

Life

Background and education
Murray Shipley Monroe Sr. was born on September 25, 1925.  He graduated from The Governor's Academy prep school in 1943, where he was awarded the school's Morse Flag.  He served in the U.S. Navy during World War II.  Following military service, he earned a B.S. from Yale University in Mechanical Engineering and earned a law degree from the University of Pennsylvania Law School.  At UPenn, he also served as Law Review editor.

Career
Monroe joined Taft, Stettinius & Hollister in 1950 and worked there for the next 53 years.  He developed the firm’s Antitrust practice.  By 1993, "Taft’s antitrustpractice was rated No. 1 in the Midwestern United States by the Global Research Survey of 1,300 lawyers nation-wide."

Clients included:  Sperry Rand, Kroger, Union Oil, Kimball International, Leggett & Platt, Central Investment, Hilltop Concrete, McGraw-Edison, and Ashland Oil.

Monroe wrote law review articles, trained the firm’s lawyers in legal writing, research, and advocacy, and served on all major committees.

Community service
For the Ohio State Bar Association, Monroe served on the Antitrust Section’s Board of Governors  and taught Intensified Antitrust Law seminars.

For the Seven Hills School, he served on its board of trustees for a decade, mostly as chairman or treasurer. Under his leadership, Seven Hills expanded its capital and became one of Cincinnati’s best known schools.

Personal and death
Monroe married Sally Longstreth, with whom he had four children:  Tracy, Murray, Courtney, and David.

He died on September 2, 2003.

Writings
 Prophylactic Antitrust (1982)
 Trade and Professional Associations: An Overview of Horizontal Restraints (1984)
 Health Care:  Current Antitrust Issues (1993)

References

External sources
 

1925 births
Ohio lawyers
American legal writers
Criminal defense lawyers
Yale University alumni
University of Pennsylvania Law School alumni
2003 deaths
20th-century American lawyers
The Governor's Academy alumni